Gastão Elias was the defending champion but lost in the first round to Camilo Ugo Carabelli.

Christian Garín won the title after defeating Federico Delbonis 6–3, 6–4 in the final.

Seeds

Draw

Finals

Top half

Bottom half

References
Main Draw
Qualifying Draw

Campeonato Internacional de Tênis de Campinas - Singles
2018 Singles